Mohd Sharim bin Md Zain is a Malaysian politician and currently serves as member of State Assembly for Chini.

Political career

He joined UMNO and served as officer to his predecessor, Abu Bakar Harun who was Chini assemblyman.

He currently holds position as Committee Member of UMNO Pekan as well as Youth Chief of UMNO FELDA Chini 3 Branch.

2020 Chini by-election

In July 2020, Mohd Sharim first contested to become a Member of the Legislative Assembly (MLA) in Chini by-election. The election was held following the death of the incumbent Member of the Legislative Assembly (MLA) from United Malays National Organisation (UMNO), Abu Bakar Harun on 7 May who had held the seat since 2004.

On 18 June, Barisan Nasional decided to nominate Mohd Sharim , who is a FELDA resident as its candidate for the by-election.

He won the by-election after defeating two other Independent candidates, Tengku Zainul Hisham Tengku Hussin (former Deputy Division Chief of BERSATU Pekan) and Mohd Shukri Mohd Ramli (Social Activist), by 12,650 majority.

Election Results

References

Living people
People from Pahang
Malaysian people of Malay descent
Malaysian Muslims
United Malays National Organisation politicians
Members of the Pahang State Legislative Assembly
21st-century Malaysian politicians
1979 births